The Cincinnati Reds' 1990 season was the Reds' 122nd season in American baseball. Starting with a club best nine straight wins to open the season, as well as holding the top spot in the National League West every game during the season, the Reds went 41–21 after 62 games, splitting the remaining 100 games 50–50 to end up with a 91–71 record. It consisted of the 91–71 Reds winning the National League West by five games over the second-place Dodgers, as well as the National League Championship Series in six games over the Pittsburgh Pirates, and the World Series in a four-game sweep over the overwhelming favorite Oakland Athletics, who had won the World Series the previous year.  It was the fifth World Championship for the Reds, and their first since winning two consecutive titles in 1975 and '76.

Offseason
 December 6, 1989: John Franco and Don Brown (minors) were traded by the Reds to the New York Mets for Randy Myers and Kip Gross.
 December 12, 1989: Tim Leary and Van Snider were traded by the Reds to the New York Yankees for Hal Morris and Rodney Imes (minors).

Regular season

Led by new manager Lou Piniella, the Reds achieved the rare feat of being in first place every day of the season ("wire-to-wire"). They also became the first National League team to do so. Starting pitcher Jack Armstrong was a catalyst for the team's fast start, as he won 8 of his first 9 games and was 11–3 through the All Star break.  Because of his strong first half, Armstrong was selected as the starting pitcher for the All Star Game.

The Reds clinched the NL West division on Saturday September 29 in a rain-shortened, seven-inning 3–1 home loss to San Diego. The second-place Dodgers lost to the Giants at the same time, mathematically clinching the division for Cincinnati with four games remaining.

Opening Day
Due to the 1990 lockout, Opening Day was pushed back one week from April 2 to April 9. As a result, the Reds who traditionally started every major league season with the first pitch at home on opening day, were forced to start on the road. The Reds played three games at Houston and three games at Atlanta before returning for their home opener on Tuesday April 17. It was only the third time since 1876 that the Reds opened the season with an away game. The traditional Findlay Market parade, along with other customary opening day festivities, were held off until April 17 and rebranded "Reds Homecoming." On a chilly 49° afternoon, the 6–0 Reds beat San Diego in front of a crowd of 38,384 at Riverfront Stadium - small for opening day standards - to improve to 7–0 on the season.

1990 Major League Baseball All-Star Game

Cincinnati was well represented at the 1990 All-Star Game in Chicago. In addition to Armstrong at pitcher, Chris Sabo, Barry Larkin, Rob Dibble, and Randy Myers were reserves.

The Nasty Boys
Another new face in the Reds locker room was Randy Myers. He was acquired from the New York Mets for closer John Franco, and became part of the Nasty Boys, along with Rob Dibble and Norm Charlton. Charlton, Dibble, and Myers combined for 44 saves (Myers with 31, Dibble with 11, and Charlton with 2). Myers would become one of the league's elite closers while being selected as an All-Star in 1990. Myers would win his second World Championship as the Reds swept the Oakland Athletics.

 "The Nasty Boys — The Reds' three flame-throwing relievers, Randy Myers, Rob Dibble and Norm Charlton, emerged as arguably the deepest and most talented late-inning pitchers in postseason history." — John Erardi and John Fay, The Cincinnati Enquirer

Season standings

Record vs. opponents

Notable transactions
 June 4, 1990: 1990 Major League Baseball draft
Dan Wilson was drafted by the Reds in the 1st round.
John Roper was drafted by the Reds in the 12th round.
June 9, 1990: Ron Robinson was traded by the Cincinnati Reds with Bob Sebra to the Milwaukee Brewers for Billy Bates and Glenn Braggs.
June 18, 1990: Rolando Roomes was selected off waivers by the Montreal Expos from the Cincinnati Reds.
 August 24, 1990: Ken Griffey, Sr. was released by the Reds.
 August 30, 1990: Bill Doran was traded by the Houston Astros to the Cincinnati Reds for players to be named later.
 September 7, 1990: Butch Henry was sent by the Cincinnati Reds to the Houston Astros to complete an earlier deal made on August 30, 1990. Catcher Terry McGriff was also sent by the Cincinnati Reds to complete the deal.

Roster

Opening Day Lineup

Player stats

Batting

Starters by position
Note: Pos = Position; G = Games played; AB = At bats; H = Hits; Avg. = Batting average; HR = Home runs; RBI = Runs batted in

Other batters
Note: G = Games played; AB = At bats; H = Hits; Avg. = Batting average; HR = Home runs; RBI = Runs batted in

Pitching

Starting pitchers
Note: G = Games pitched; IP = Innings pitched; W = Wins; L = Losses; ERA = Earned run average; SO = Strikeouts

Other pitchers
Note: G = Games pitched; IP = Innings pitched; W = Wins; L = Losses; ERA = Earned run average; SO = Strikeouts

Relief pitchers
Note: G = Games pitched; W = Wins; L = Losses; SV = Saves; ERA = Earned run average; SO = Strikeouts

National League Championship Series

Game 1
October 4: Riverfront Stadium in Cincinnati

Game 2
October 5: Riverfront Stadium in Cincinnati

Game 3
October 8: Three Rivers Stadium in Pittsburgh, Pennsylvania

Game 4
October 9: Three Rivers Stadium in Pittsburgh, Pennsylvania

Game 5
October 10: Three Rivers Stadium in Pittsburgh, Pennsylvania

Game 6
October 12: Riverfront Stadium in Cincinnati

World Series

The World Series between the Oakland Athletics and the Reds featured friends at the managerial level. Athletics manager Tony La Russa and Reds manager Lou Piniella were old friends and teammates from their Tampa American Legion Post 248 team.

Before the Series, while Peter Gammons of ESPN had predicted an Oakland sweep, Chicago Tribune columnist Mike Royko issued the stunning prediction that the heavily favored A's were "doomed", based on the Ex-Cubs Factor. When the prediction came true, it fueled new interest in that arguably spurious correlation.

Cincinnati Reds owner Marge Schott, who was drunk at the time, made a major verbal slip-up when she dedicated the 1990 World Series to "our women and men in the Far East" (Schott meant to say Middle East).  In the first inning of Game 1, Reds center fielder Eric Davis hit a home run in left center that nearly hit the CBS television studio where anchor Pat O'Brien was sitting.

Also in Game 1, Billy Hatcher helped out offensively in a big way by starting his streak of 7 straight hits in the series (after a walk in the 1st).  José Rijo settled in after the early lead and cruised to a surprise Cincinnati victory. The following day, the headline of the Cincinnati Post newspaper captured the city's surprise with the headline, "DAVIS STUNS GOLIATH."

During Game 2, Reds pitcher Tom Browning's pregnant wife Debbie went into labor during the game. Debbie left her seat in the fifth inning to drive herself to the hospital. As the game went on, the Reds wanted Browning ready to pitch just in case the game went well into extra innings. Thinking that Browning was en route to a nearby hospital, the Reds had their radio broadcaster Marty Brennaman put out an All Points Bulletin on Browning, a bulletin that was picked up by Tim McCarver on CBS television, who passed it along in the ninth inning.

Game 4 was a pitchers' duel between Dave Stewart and José Rijo (the Game 1 starters) that eventually culminated in the Reds sweeping the series.  The A's got on the board in the first when Willie McGee doubled and Carney Lansford singled him in.  The game remained 1–0 until the 8th when the Reds finally got to Stewart.

Barry Larkin singled up the middle, Herm Winningham followed with a bunt single, and Paul O'Neill reached on a throwing error by Stewart that loaded the bases.  Glen Braggs's groundout and Hal Morris's sacrifice fly gave the Reds a precious 2–1 edge which was preserved by both Rijo, who at one point retired 20 straight batters. Randy Myers, one of the Nasty Boys, appeared in relief and got the final two outs.

The 1990 World Series would be the Reds 5th championship but would also be remembered as one of the biggest upsets in baseball history. Until 2020, this was the last World Series to be scheduled to begin play on a Tuesday, and the only since 1984. The schedule called for the seven-game series to be held Tue-Wed, Fri-Sat-Sun, Tue-Wed. Games 5, 6, and 7, however were not necessary.

Highlights
The three primary members of the bullpen; Norm Charlton, Randy Myers, and Rob Dibble (who threw a fastball in excess of 99 mph) were known as the "Nasty Boys" – and wouldn't let the A's score against them in nearly nine innings of work.  Media talk of a forthcoming A's dynasty led Reds fans to call their own team the "dyNASTY."

Reds outfielder Billy Hatcher set a World Series record with seven consecutive hits. In addition, Hatcher's .750 batting average, (9 for 12), broke a mark for a four-game World Series that was previously set by Babe Ruth (.625 in 1928).

Cincinnati Reds' pitcher José Rijo became the second Dominican born player to earn World Series MVP honors. The first Dominican born to earn World Series MVP honors was Pedro Guerrero of the Los Angeles Dodgers.

Matchups

Game 1
October 16, 1990, at Riverfront Stadium in Cincinnati

Game 2
October 17, 1990, at Riverfront Stadium, in Cincinnati

Game 3
October 19, 1990, at Oakland–Alameda County Coliseum in Oakland, California

Game 4
October 20, 1990, at Oakland–Alameda County Coliseum in Oakland, California

mlb.com coverage of Game 4

Composite Box
 1990 World Series (4–0): Cincinnati Reds (N.L.) over Oakland Athletics (A.L.)
{| border="1" cellspacing="0"  style="width:575px; margin-left:3em;"
|- style="text-align:center; background:#e6e6e6;"
!  style="text-align:left; width:155px;"|Team
!width=25|1
!width=25|2
!width=25|3
!width=25|4
!width=25|5
!width=25|6
!width=25|7
!width=25|8
!width=25|9
!width=25|10
!width=25|R
!width=25|H
!width=25|E
|- style="text-align:center;"
|align=left|Cincinnati Reds
|4||1||9
|1||3||0
|0||3||0
|1
|22||45||4
|- style="text-align:center;"
|align=left|Oakland Athletics
|2||2||4
|0||0||0
|0||0||0
|0
|8||28||5
|- style="text-align:left;"
|colspan=15|Total Attendance: 208,544   Average Attendance: 52,136
|- style="text-align:left;"
|colspan=15|<small>Winning Player's Share:  – $112,534,   Losing Player's Share – $86,961 *Includes Playoffs and World Series</small>
|}

Awards and honors
 Jack Armstrong, Pitcher of the Month Award, May
 Rob Dibble, Relief Pitcher and Randy Myers, Relief Pitcher, NLCS MVP
 Billy Hatcher, Outfield, Babe Ruth Award
 Billy Hatcher, Highest Batting Average in a World Series
 Barry Larkin, Shortstop, National League Silver Slugger Award
 José Rijo, Pitcher, World Series MVPAll-Star Game' Jack Armstrong, pitcher, starter
 Chris Sabo, third base, starter
 Rob Dibble, relief pitcher, reserve
 Barry Larkin, shortstop, reserve
 Randy Myers, relief pitcher, reserve

Farm system

LEAGUE CHAMPIONS: Charleston

References

1990 Cincinnati Reds season at Baseball Reference1990 Cincinnati Reds season at Baseball Almanac''
1990 Reds: The Nasty Boys

National League West champion seasons
National League champion seasons
World Series champion seasons
Cincinnati Reds seasons
Cincinnati Reds season
Cinc